Saint-Édouard-de-Maskinongé is a municipality in the Mauricie region of the province of Quebec in Canada.

Demographics
Population trend:
 Population in 2021: 798 (2016 to 2021 population change: 12.1%)
 Population in 2016: 712
 Population in 2011: 774
 Population in 2006: 800
 Population in 2001: 730
 Population in 1996: 744

Private dwellings occupied by usual residents: 359 (total dwellings: 402)

References

External links

Incorporated places in Mauricie
Municipalities in Quebec